Po Sam Pai is a village in Plover Cove, Tai Po District, Hong Kong.

Administration
Po Sam Pai is a recognized village under the New Territories Small House Policy. It is one of the villages represented within the Tai Po Rural Committee. For electoral purposes, Po Sam Pai is part of the Shuen Wan constituency, which was formerly represented by So Tat-leung until October 2021.

History
At the time of the 1911 census, the population of Po Sam Pai was 156. The number of males was 70.

References

External links

 Delineation of area of existing village Po Sam Pai (Tai Po) for election of resident representative (2019 to 2022)

Villages in Tai Po District, Hong Kong